Erotic hypnosis is a broad term for a variety of erotic activities involving hypnosis. Some erotic hypnosis is practiced in the context of BDSM relationships and communities. In addition, for some people hypnosis is inherently erotic, making it an example of a sexual fetish or paraphilia.

Practice
Erotic hypnosis can involve hypnotic suggestions intended to increase arousal, to create or enhance sexual pleasure (which may involve "hands-free orgasms"), to produce new sensations, to freeze partners in place or simulate bondage, or to enhance roleplay, with popular types of hypnotic roleplay including animal transformations, robot play and doll play. Erotic hypnosis may be done face-to-face, over video conferencing or text chat, or through pre-recorded audio files or videos. Sessions may involve suggestions that are to take effect during trance or afterwards, in the form of post-hypnotic suggestions, some of which might be triggered by an action or situation.

Relation to BDSM
Hypnosis is an increasingly popular practice within a dominance and submission relationship to reinforce power exchange and as a form of kinky play. Some people report that being hypnotized produces a strong feeling of giving up control, for example the feeling that they must obey the hypnotist's commands.  Several practitioners have compared the sensation of trance to subspace. Major BDSM events in North America now frequently contain classes and workshops dedicated to erotic hypnosis, such as events run by Black Rose and TES. In addition to a presence at these general BDSM events, since 2009 national-level erotic hypnosis conventions have been held in cities in North America and worldwide, as well as local meetups such as munches.

As a fetish

A subset of those interested in erotic hypnosis find hypnosis inherently erotic, therefore making it an example of a sexual fetish. They may be aroused by hypnotizing others, by the feeling of being hypnotized, or by seeing people being hypnotized.

Hypnosis fetishism has been recorded in the clinical literature as far back as 1957, when George Merrill noted that "to many hypnotic subjects, hypnosis has strong sexual connotations". In one case study of a patient who eroticized hypnosis, he wrote

Her enthusiasm for hypnosis, her obvious enjoyment of the trance, and her relaxed, happy, 'starry-eyed' appearance after awakening from each trance suggested that she was deriving more gratification from the hypnotic experience than would be likely just from the relief of symptoms and the gaining of insight.

Hypnosis fetishism has a large overlap with mind control fetishism, which in addition to typically unrealistic, fantasy depictions of hypnotic control, may include magic (e.g., telepathy, vampires) or fictional technology (e.g., brainwashing machines, robotization) as plot devices. Hypnosis and mind control fetish content has been shared on the internet since its early years, as in a 1997 survey of stories from alt.sex.stories which found that "five percent of stories involved some kind of mind control (such as hypnosis, the use of mythical mind control machines or drugs)". More recently, videos consisting of rapidly edited sexual clips combined with text or audio that caters to fantasies of being brainwashed, for example into forced feminization, have gained in popularity.

References

Hypnosis
BDSM
Sexual fetishism
Paraphilias